Rugby in Cornwall may refer to:
                                      
Rugby union in Cornwall
Rugby league in Cornwall